Xorcist is the name of an American musical group whose output has ranged from electro-industrial and ambient.

Background

Peter Stone (a.k.a. Bat) formed Xorcist in 1990 as a one-man act. By 1997, Xorcist grew to include Evoltwin. In addition to providing some vocals, Evoltwin created the cover art for Soul Reflection and other subsequent releases.

Stone also created two side projects, Xenon and Diode Fetish.

Stone still DJs and VJs under the name DJ/VJ Bat, and maintains the Xorcist.com website to promote his work.

Stone's work in sound design has appeared in MTV's Aeon Flux, and his work creating music and sound design in the video games Iron Helix, Bad Mojo and Space Bunnies Must Die.

Discography

Studio albums

Compilation appearances

Singles and EPs

References

External links
Official Xorcist and CyberDen website

Musical groups established in 1985
American electro-industrial music groups
1985 establishments in California
21st Circuitry artists